Ayedaade Government High School is a senior high school in Ikire, Irewole local government, Osun State, Nigeria. It was built for about 3,000 students. The Governor of Osun, Rauf Aregbesola, and the Federal Minister of Education, Adamu Adamu, attended the commissioning of the school in 2018.

References

Secondary schools in Osun State
 Secondary schools in Nigeria
2018 establishments in Nigeria
Educational institutions established in 2018